Otto Hofmann (16 March 1896 – 31 December 1982) was a German SS functionary during the Nazi era and head of the SS Race and Settlement Main Office. He participated in the January 1942 Wannsee Conference, at which the genocidal Final Solution to the Jewish Question was planned. Sentenced to 25 years in prison at the RuSHA Trial in 1948, Hofmann was released on 7 April 1954.

Life
Hofmann was born in Innsbruck, Tyrol. Hofmann, the son of a merchant, in August 1914 volunteered for service in the First World War. In March 1917, he was promoted to lieutenant. In June 1917, he was taken prisoner by the Russians. However, Hofmann escaped from captivity and returned to Germany. Hofmann completed his pilot training before he was released in 1919 to civilian life. After short-term operation in a Freikorps, he trained as a wine salesman and was active from 1920 to 1925 in wine wholesale. He then started his own business as a wine representative.

In April 1923, Hofmann joined the Nazi Party (member: 145,729) and in April 1931 he joined the SS (member: 7,646). From 1933 forward, he worked full-time as an SS officer. On 29 March 1933, he ran unsuccessfully in the general election.

In 1931, the SS Race and Settlement Main Office (RuSHA), was created by Heinrich Himmler and Richard Walther Darré. In 1939, Hofmann was co-editor of the journal Biologist. From July 1940 to April 1943, he was chief of the RuSHA. In this capacity, he participated in the "Germanisation" of the captured territory of Poland and in the Soviet Union. This involved the resettling of Germans in the Nazi-occupied Eastern territories and ejecting the native families from those lands.

Hoffman was responsible for conducting the official Race test on the population of the occupied territories for racial selection. The office was also responsible for the abduction of Polish children to Germany and for the SS - kin care. He was present at the Wannsee Conference on 20 January 1942, for the so-called "Final Solution to the Jewish Question". In April 1943, Hofmann was transferred to Stuttgart as SS and Police Leader for South-Western Germany (Württemberg, Baden and Alsace). He was the commander of the prisoners in the local Military District Villsmania.

Post war
After the war, Hofmann was put on trial in March 1948 at the RuSHA Trial for his actions as chief of the Race and Settlement Main Office. He was charged with crimes against humanity and war crimes. In 1948 Hofmann was sentenced to 25 years in prison, which was reduced to 15 years in 1951. On 7 April 1954, Hofmann was released from Landsberg Prison. Thereafter, he was a clerk in Württemberg until he died in Bad Mergentheim on 31 December 1982.

References

1896 births
1982 deaths
Holocaust perpetrators
Military personnel from Innsbruck
People from the County of Tyrol
SS and Police Leaders
Nazis convicted of war crimes
German people convicted of crimes against humanity
People convicted by the United States Nuremberg Military Tribunals
Waffen-SS personnel
SS-Obergruppenführer
German military personnel of World War I
German prisoners of war in World War I
World War I prisoners of war held by Russia
Escapees from Russian detention
German escapees
20th-century Freikorps personnel
Military personnel of Bavaria
Luftstreitkräfte personnel